Mecostethus is a genus of grasshoppers belonging to the family Acrididae. The species of this genus are found in Europe, Central Russia and Japan.

Species
The following species are recognised in the genus Mecostethus:

References

Acrididae
Caelifera genera